The Edwin H. Sutherland Award is an annual award that has been given by the American Society of Criminology (ASC) since 1960. Named for the influential American criminologist Edwin H. Sutherland, the award recognizes a scholar who has made distinguished contributions to theory or research in criminology. It is the most important annual award given by the ASC.

See also

 List of social sciences awards

References

External links
List of past winners

Awards established in 1960
Criminology
Social sciences awards